Fritz Schmid (born 10 September 1959) is a Swiss football coach.

He spent seven years as the assistant manager of FC Basel under head coach Christian Gross, a period in which the club won the Swiss Cup four times and qualified for the UEFA Champions League twice. In 2018, he was appointed manager of the New Zealand national football team.

In April 2022, Schmid stepped in as interim head coach of Ghanaian team Kotoku Royals F.C. for the remainder of the 2021/22 season.

Managerial Statistics

References

1959 births
Living people
People from Zug
Sportspeople from the canton of Zug
Swiss football managers
FC Basel non-playing staff
Grasshopper Club Zürich non-playing staff
Tottenham Hotspur F.C. non-playing staff
FC Aarau non-playing staff
SC Kriens managers
New Zealand national football team managers